SPDC Colony or Spare Part Division Colony/Centre? {Marathi-एसपीडीसी कालोनी(सुरक्षा विहार)} is located in Mankhurd, a suburb of Mumbai, India.

Neighbourhoods in Mumbai